Sergiu Cătălin Hanca (born 4 April 1992) is a Romanian professional footballer who plays as a right winger for Liga I club Universitatea Craiova.

Club career

Early career
Hanca began playing football as a youngster for hometown club FCM Târgu Mureș. In 2009, he joined Snagov and started his professional career in the Liga II, the second level of the Romanian football league system. Hanca amassed totals of 38 games and one goal in that competition before having a brief spell with Bihor Oradea at the beginning of 2012.

Târgu Mureș
In mid-2012, Hanca was brought back to FCM Târgu Mureș. He made 22 appearances and scored two goals during the 2013–14 season, as his team achieved promotion to the first league.

Hanca won his first career trophy after the club, now renamed ASA Târgu Mureș, defeated FC Steaua București in the 2015 Romanian Supercup.

He made his European competitions debut on 6 August 2015, starting in a 2–1 away victory over French side Saint-Étienne in the Europa League play-off round.

Dinamo București
On 8 January 2016, Hanca signed a three-and-a-half-year contract with top-flight club Dinamo București. He played his first official match for the Cainii roșii in a 1–0 league win against FC Botoșani on 14 February.

International career
In March 2017, Hanca was picked by manager Christoph Daum in Romania's squad for the 2018 FIFA World Cup qualifier against Denmark. He eventually made his debut coming on as a substitute against Poland in a 3–1 loss on 10 June.

Personal life
Hanca married his girlfriend Andreea in May 2016; their wedding took place in Târgu Mureș in the summer of the same year. The couple is known for their charity work.

Career statistics

International

Honours
ASA Târgu Mureș
Supercupa României: 2015

Dinamo București
Cupa României runner-up: 2015–16
Cupa Ligii: 2016–17

Cracovia
Polish Cup: 2019–20
Polish Super Cup: 2020

Individual
DigiSport Liga I Player of the Month: April 2017, August 2017
Liga I Team of the Season: 2016–17

References

External links

1992 births
Living people
Sportspeople from Târgu Mureș
Romanian footballers
Association football midfielders
Liga I players
Liga II players
Ekstraklasa players
FC Bihor Oradea players
ASA 2013 Târgu Mureș players
FC Dinamo București players
MKS Cracovia (football) players
CS Universitatea Craiova players
AS Voința Snagov players
Romanian expatriate footballers
Romanian expatriate sportspeople in Poland
Expatriate footballers in Poland
Romania international footballers